Jill Elizabeth Cruwys (5 December 1943 – 30 December 1990) was an English cricketer who played primarily as a batter. She appeared in 5 Test matches and 7 One Day Internationals for England between 1969 and 1976. Cruwys was a member of the successful England team that beat Australia at Edgbaston to win the first Women's World Cup in July 1973. She played domestic cricket primarily for Kent and West Midlands, as well as appearing in one match for West of England.

References

External links
 

1943 births
1990 deaths
People from Bromley
England women Test cricketers
England women One Day International cricketers
Kent women cricketers
West Midlands women cricketers
West women cricketers